Tsai Jui-yueh (8 February 1921 – 29 May 2005) was a Taiwanese dancer and choreographer regarded as the mother of modern dance in Taiwan.

Life and career
Born in Tainan on 8 February 1921, Tsai made her way to Japan in 1937 to study dance under  and Midori Ishii. Prior to leaving Taiwan, Tsai's experience with dancing included aerobic dance class in elementary school and watching Japanese groups in high school. She had heard a Japanese person refer to Taiwan as a "barren desert for dance" and sought to return in order to promote the art of dance in Taiwan, declining a personal dance recital in Tokyo arranged by Midori Ishii. Tsai returned to Taiwan in 1946, and grew in popularity during this period, in part because she accepted every offer to perform. 

She married the Indonesian-Chinese poet , who taught at National Taiwan University, in 1947. Lei was imprisoned by Kuomintang authorities in June 1949 and later deported to Guangdong. Tsai was sent to Green Island shortly thereafter and released three years later, but barred from leaving Taiwan. In 1953, she founded her own school of dance at the China Dance Club, later known as the Tsai Jui-yueh Dance Research Institute. Tsai's travel restrictions were lifted in 1983, and she moved to Australia to live and work with her son, a dancer who was a student of Elizabeth Dalman. Tsai's studio was left to daughter-in-law Ondine Hsiao and Hsiao's sister Grace. The building was to be demolished in 1994, but plans were called off after three dancers protested by suspending themselves in the air via crane for 24 hours. The Taipei City government named Tsai's studio a municipal heritage site in October 1999. Four days later, the building burned in a suspected arson attack. Reconstruction efforts began in March 2002. Tsai died in Brisbane, Australia, on 29 May 2005, aged 84.

Legacy
The inaugural Tsai Jui-Yueh International Dance Festival was organized in her honor in 2006. Her former studio opened as a museum in May 2007 and a memorial was added to the site in March 2008. In 2017, the Tsai Jui-yueh Dance Research Institute and the Nylon Cheng Liberty Foundation and Memorial Museum jointly organized demonstrations marking the anniversary of the February 28 incident. Tsai's life was commemorated by the National Human Rights Commission, a division of the Control Yuan, in November 2020. 

Tsai is considered the mother of modern dance in Taiwan. One of her students, Henry Yu, has been called the father of Taiwanese modern dance.

References

1921 births
2005 deaths
People from Tainan
Taiwanese female dancers
Taiwanese choreographers
Taiwanese emigrants to Australia
Taiwanese prisoners and detainees
Prisoners and detainees of Taiwan
Taiwanese expatriates in Japan
Women choreographers
20th-century dancers